"Beautiful Loser" is a song written and recorded by American rock artist Bob Seger. It was the title track on his 1975 studio album Beautiful Loser. The single just missed inclusion on the US Top 100, but became more widely known when it was included on Seger's breakout album, 'Live' Bullet (1976), where it was paired with "Travelin' Man".

Content
The song is about people who set their goals so low that they never achieve anything. Seger got the idea for the song from Beautiful Losers, a novel written by Leonard Cohen. Contrary to what many believed, the song is not about Seger himself. It took over a year to finish the song, and Seger wrote three or four versions of the song before settling on one that worked.

Reception
Cash Box described it as "a country-rocker" with "super hot production and rhythm."

Classic Rock History critic Janey Roberts rated it as Seger's 5th best song.

Chart performance

Covers
 Point Blank covered the song on Second Season (Arista) 1977 
 Jon English covered the song on his album, Beating the Boards (1982)

References

Bob Seger songs
1975 singles
Songs written by Bob Seger
Capitol Records singles
1975 songs
Song recordings produced by Bob Seger